The Skelton Inlet is an ice-filled inlet at the terminus of the Skelton Glacier, along the western edge of the Ross Ice Shelf in Antarctica. The feature is about 16 km (10 mi) wide at the entry points between Cape Timberlake and Fishtail Point, where it is about 1500 m deep. Its deepest point is 1933 m below sea level. It was discovered by the British National Antarctic Expedition (BrNAE), 1901–04, which named this feature for Lt. Reginald W. Skelton (Royal Navy), chief engineer of the expedition's ship .

References

Inlets of Antarctica
Bodies of water of the Ross Dependency
Hillary Coast